The Mohana, sometimes referred to as Mohanoمهانو, are a Sindhi tribe called Mohano Mallah Mirbahar Mirani in the province of Sindh and they reside themselves along the coastlines of sindh these are the places of their majority of the areas in these cities Karachi,thatta,keti bandar and Mohana’s are the pioneer’s of karachi.

Distribution 
Most Mohana families live in karachi, thatta,keti bandar,Son miyanri,Daamb

Culture 
They often refer to themselves as Mir Bahar  (meaning 'Lord of the sea'). They are mostly Sunni Muslims and speak |Sindhi language]] and they basically are sindhi they have the historical man which is known as morro mohano who took revenge from a shark who ate his 4 brothers and this historical moment took place at mauripur road once it was the coastline and now it is under the overpass of gulbai where there are the graves of morro’s brothers and this history is centuries old and  this is from karachi the fishing village of sindhi fishermen’s. In

References 

Sindhi tribes
Saraiki tribes